Said Masoud El-Agimi (born 4 September 1964) is a Libyan judoka. He competed in the men's half-lightweight event at the 1992 Summer Olympics.

References

External links
 

1964 births
Living people
Libyan male judoka
Olympic judoka of Libya
Judoka at the 1992 Summer Olympics
Place of birth missing (living people)